Gaillea is a genus of sea snails, marine gastropod mollusks in the family Eosiphonidae.

Species
Species within the genus Gaillea include:
 Gaillea canetae (Clench & Aguayo, 1944)
 Gaillea coriolis (Bouchet & Warén, 1986)
 Gaillea engonia (Bouchet & Warén, 1986)
 Gaillea tosaensis (Okutani & Iwahori, 1992)

References

 Bouchet, P. & Warén, A., 1986. Mollusca Gastropoda: Taxonomical notes on tropical deep water Buccinidae with descriptions of new taxa. Mémoires du Muséum national d'Histoire naturelle 133("1985"): 457-517
 Fraussen, K.; Stahlschmidt, P. (2016). The extensive Indo-Pacific deep-water radiation of Manaria E.A. Smith, 1906 (Gastropoda: Buccinidae) and related genera, with descriptions of 21 new species. in: Héros, V. et al. (Ed.) Tropical Deep-Sea Benthos 29. Mémoires du Muséum national d'Histoire naturelle (1993). 208: 363–456.

External links
 Kantor Yu.I., Puillandre N., Fraussen K., Fedosov A.E. & Bouchet P. (2013) Deep-water Buccinidae (Gastropoda: Neogastropoda) from sunken wood, vents and seeps: Molecular phylogeny and taxonomy. Journal of the Marine Biological Association of the United Kingdom, 93(8): 2177-2195.

Eosiphonidae